Good Cookin' is an album by saxophonist Junior Cook recorded in 1979 and released on the Muse label.

Reception 

The Allmusic review called it a "all-star hard-bop cast".

Track listing 
All compositions by Slide Hampton except where noted.
 "J.C." – 7:07
 "I'm Getting Sentimental Over You" (George Bassman, Ned Washington) – 4:58
 "Play Together Again" – 5:12
 "Waltz for Junior" – 7:45
 "I Waited for You" (Dizzy Gillespie, Gil Fuller) – 4:39
 "Mood" – 7:23

Personnel 
Junior Cook – tenor saxophone
Bill Hardman – trumpet, flugelhorn
Slide Hampton – trombone, arranger
Mario Rivera – baritone saxophone
Albert Dailey – piano
Walter Booker – bass
Leroy Williams – drums

References 

Junior Cook albums
1980 albums
Muse Records albums
Albums recorded at Van Gelder Studio